Maria T. Zuber (born June 27, 1958) is an American geophysicist who is the vice president for research at the Massachusetts Institute of Technology, where she also holds the position of the E. A. Griswold Professor of Geophysics in the Department of Earth, Atmospheric and Planetary Sciences. Zuber has been involved in more than half a dozen NASA planetary missions aimed at mapping the Moon, Mars, Mercury, and several asteroids. She was the principal investigator for the Gravity Recovery and Interior Laboratory (GRAIL) Mission, which was managed by NASA's Jet Propulsion Laboratory.

Since January 2021, Zuber serves as co-chair of President Joe Biden's Council of Advisors on Science and Technology (PCAST). She was previously a member of the National Science Board.

Early life and education 
Maria T. Zuber was born on June 27, 1958 in Norristown, Pennsylvania. She grew up in Summit Hill, Pennsylvania in Pennsylvania's Coal Region, one of five children of Joseph and Dolores (Stoffa) Zuber. She has three brothers, Joseph Jr., Stephen, and Andrew (1966–2018), and a sister, Joanne. Both her grandfathers were coal miners and contracted black lung disease.

Zuber received her B.A. in astronomy and geology from the University of Pennsylvania in 1980; she was the first person in her family to attend college.

Zuber earned Sc.M. and Ph.D. degrees, both in geophysics, from Brown University in 1983 and 1986 respectively. Reflecting on her decision to apply to Ivy League graduate schools and not MIT, Zuber joked "I remember saying, I don't want to go to any nerd school... and of course, I'm the biggest nerd there is."

Career
Zuber later worked at Johns Hopkins University and was a research scientist at the NASA Goddard Space Flight Center in Maryland. She joined the faculty of MIT in 1995 and was the head of the Department of Earth, Atmospheric and Planetary Sciences from 2003 to 2012. She is the first woman to lead a science department at MIT. Since 2012, she has been vice president for research at MIT.

Zuber's professional focus has been on the structure and tectonics of solid solar system objects. She is a pioneer in the measurement of the shapes of the surfaces of the inner planets, and in interpreting what those shapes mean for internal structure and dynamics, thermal history, and surface-atmosphere interactions. She specializes in using gravity and laser altimetry measurements to determine interior structure and evolution. The topographic maps of Mars and the Moon produced by her laser altimeters on the Mars Global Surveyor and Lunar Reconnaissance Orbiter spacecraft are more accurate than that of Earth. She has been a team member on 10 NASA planetary missions, including Mars Global Surveyor, Dawn, and MESSENGER.

Zuber became interested in planetary science at an early age. A desire to spread her childhood enthusiasm was one reason why she teamed up with former astronaut Sally Ride to include in the GRAIL mission components that would capture the imagination of young students. A student contest provided the names for the mission's two spacecraft, Ebb and Flow, and students can sign up to use GRAIL's Moon Knowledge Acquired by Middle school students (MoonKAM) instrument.

In January 2021, Zuber was appointed co-chair of President-elect Joe Biden's President's Council of Advisors on Science and Technology (PCAST).

Honors and awards

 2002: 50 Most Important Women in Science (Discover Magazine).
2004: NASA Distinguished Public Service Medal.
2005: Elected to the American Philosophical Society
2007: American Astronautical Society/Planetary Society Carl Sagan Memorial Award.
2007: Geological Society of America G.K. Gilbert Award
 2008: Honorary Doctor of Science degree from Brown University.
 2008: Named as one of America's Best Leaders by U.S. News & World Report, with Fiona A. Harrison. Zuber and Harrison were the first two women to be selected as scientific leaders of NASA robotic missions.
2009: NASA Group Achievement Award for the Lunar Reconnaissance Orbiter Laser Ranging Team.
2010: NASA Group Achievement Award for the Lunar Reconnaissance Orbiter Team.
2012: Massachusetts Institute of Technology James R. Killian Jr. Faculty Achievement Award.
2012: NASA Group Achievement Awards for (1) the GRAIL Science Team; (2) the GRAIL Project Office Team; and (3) the GRAIL Mission Formulation Team.
2012: NASA Outstanding Public Leadership Medal
2012: Harry Hess Medal, American Geophysical Union.
2012: International Academy of Astronautics Laurel for Team Achievement to MESSENGER Team.
2013: National Space Society, Space Pioneer Award in Science and Engineering, GRAIL Team.
2013: NASA Exceptional Achievement for Science, Lunar Reconnaissance Orbiter Science Team.
2013: NASA Group Achievement Award for the Lunar Reconnaissance Orbiter - Laser Ranger Optical Communication Experiment.
2013: NASA Group Achievement Award for the Dawn Science Team.
 2014: Buzz Aldrin Space Exploration Award, The Explorer's Club.
2015: Member, Johns Hopkins University Society of Scholars.
2015: MIT Freshman Advising Student Champion Award.
 2015: Best Referee Award, Nature Publishing
 2017: Eugene Shoemaker Distinguished Scientist Medal, NASA Solar System Exploration Virtual Science Institute
2019: Gerard P. Kuiper Prize in Planetary Sciences
2022: Golden Plate Award of the American Academy of Achievement presented by Awards Council member Dr. Francis Collins

Zuber is a fellow of the following professional societies:
American Geophysical Union
American Association for the Advancement of Science
American Astronomical Society, Division for Planetary Sciences
American Astronautical Society
Geological Society of America

The asteroid 6635 Zuber, which orbits the sun between Mars and Jupiter, is named for Zuber.

Publications
List of Maria Zuber publications (PDF)

See also
List of women in leadership positions on astronomical instrumentation projects

References

External links
 
 
  Retrieved June 30, 2011.
  Retrieved October 18, 2012.
 Maria Zuber Playlist Appearance on WMBR's Dinnertime Sampler radio show February 16, 2005
 Maria Zuber Playlist Appearance on WMBR's Dinnertime Sampler radio show November 19, 2003

20th-century American astronomers
20th-century American geologists
20th-century American women scientists
21st-century American astronomers
21st-century American geologists
21st-century American women scientists
1958 births
American people of German descent
American women academics
American women astronomers
American women geologists
Brown University alumni
Johns Hopkins University faculty
Living people
Members of the American Philosophical Society
Members of the United States National Academy of Sciences
People from Carbon County, Pennsylvania
Planetary scientists
University of Pennsylvania School of Arts and Sciences alumni
Women planetary scientists
20th-century American academics
21st-century American academics